Kana (written: 佳奈, 香奈, 香菜, 可奈, 加奈, 加那, 華菜, 夏菜, 夏南, 果奈, かな in hiragana or カナ in katakana) is a feminine Japanese given name. Notable people with the name include:

Kana (wrestler), professional wrestler
, Japanese judoka
, (born 1983) Japanese voice actress and singer
, Japanese sprinter
, Japanese voice actress
, Japanese badminton player
, Japanese voice actress, actress and singer
, Japanese volleyball player
, Japanese idol and singer
, Japanese actress
, Japanese Go player
, Japanese rugby sevens player
, Japanese kickboxer
, Japanese figure skater
, Japanese pop singer
, Japanese volleyball player
,  Japanese model
, Japanese volleyball player
, Japanese shogi player
, Japanese professional wrestler
, Japanese pop singer
, Japanese actress, model and idol
, Japanese singer and voice actress
, Japanese gymnast
, Japanese singer-songwriter

Fictional characters 
Kana, a character in the manga series Fairy Tail
Kana Anaberal, a character in the video game franchise Touhou Project
Kana, a character in the video game Fire Emblem Fates
Kana, an incarnation of Naraku in the manga series Inuyasha
, a character in the video game Ordyne
, a character in the anime series Hamtaro
, a character in the manga series Parasyte
, a character in the manga series Minami-ke
, a character in the manga series Kanamemo
Kana Nakamura, a character from the anime and manga series Nichijou
Kana Todo, a character in the video game Kana: Little Sister
, a character in the manga series Bokurano: Ours
Kana Yano, a character in the film Noroi: The Curse
Kana Yuki (夕城 香菜), a character in the film Battle Royale II: Requiem
Kana Akaba/Akabane, the mother of the main protagonist, Aiga Akaba/Akabane in the anime/manga series Beyblade Burst Chouzetsu/Turbo.
Kana, a character in the animated series Thomas and Friends: All Engines Go!

See also

Kanna (given name)
Kaja (name)

Japanese feminine given names